Strid may refer to one of several things:

The Strid, a stretch of the River Wharfe, Yorkshire
Strid (band), a black metal band from Norway
Strid (comic strip), a comic series by Danish cartoonist Jakob Martin Strid
Little Strid, a character in children's television series Roger and the Rottentrolls

People
Arne Strid, botanist
Björn Strid, rock vocalist
Jan Paul Strid, Swedish toponymist
Justus Strid, Danish figure skater